Peter Fraser Shearing (born 26 August 1938) is an English former professional footballer who played as a goalkeeper. He played professionally for West Ham United, Portsmouth, Exeter City, Plymouth Argyle, Bristol Rovers and Gillingham between 1960 and 1973, and in total made 245 appearances in the Football League.  He also won an FA Amateur Cup winners medal for Hendon in 1960.

References

1938 births
Living people
English footballers
Gillingham F.C. players
West Ham United F.C. players
Portsmouth F.C. players
Exeter City F.C. players
Plymouth Argyle F.C. players
Bristol Rovers F.C. players
Footballers from Uxbridge
English Football League players
Association football goalkeepers